The North Fork Sol Duc Shelter is located in Olympic National Park in Washington. The rustic log building provides shelter to hikers on the park's Sol Duc River trail. It was built about 1932 by the U.S. Forest Service as part of a network of about ninety trail shelters for hikers in what was then Olympic National Forest. The majority of these shelters were removed by the National Park Service in the 1970s. It is constructed with a peeled log frame covered with vertical split-fir board siding. The gabled roofline is broken with a separate shed roof extending to the front. The interior is furnished with bunks. There is no floor.

The North Fork Sol Duc Shelter was added to the National Register of Historic Places on July 13, 2007.

References

Park buildings and structures on the National Register of Historic Places in Washington (state)
Government buildings completed in 1932
Buildings and structures in Clallam County, Washington
National Register of Historic Places in Olympic National Park
Log cabins in the United States
Huts
National Register of Historic Places in Clallam County, Washington
Log buildings and structures on the National Register of Historic Places in Washington (state)
1932 establishments in Washington (state)